Eucalyptus paludicola, commonly known as Mount Compass swamp gum, marsh gum or Fleurieu swamp gum, is a species of small tree that is endemic to the south-east of South Australia. It has smooth bark, lance-shaped or curved adult leaves, flower buds usually in groups of seven, creamy white flowers, and cylindrical, conical or bell-shaped fruit. It is only known from the Fleurieu Peninsula and Kangaroo Island.

Description

Flowering mainly occurs in spring and the flowers are creamy white.

Taxonomy
Eucalyptus paludicola was first formally described in 1995 by Dean Nicolle in the Journal of the Adelaide Botanic Garden, from material he collected from near Mount Compass in 1992. The specific epithet (paludicola) is from Latin, meaning "swamp-dwelling", referring to the habitat of this eucalypt.

Distribution and habitat
Mount Compass swamp gum grows in seasonally swampy places, sometimes in pure stands, mainly on the eastern and southern sides of the Mount Lofty Ranges. A few individuals have been recorded on Kangeroo Island. It is sometimes confused with swamp gum, E. ovata subsp. ovata which grows in similar habitats but has thinner, glossy green adult leaves, smaller buds and consistently conical fruit.

Conservation status
This eucalypt is listed as "endangered" under the Australian Government Environment Protection and Biodiversity Conservation Act 1999 and as "vulnerble" under the Government of South Australian National Parks and Wildlife Act 1972. The main threats to the species are swamp drainage, land clearing, road works and weed invasion. A project has been undertaken to enhance the viability of the species and to increase the total number of individuals in the wild from the roughly 600 plants in 2012.

Use in horticulture
Mount Compass swamp gum flowers prolifically and although not known is cultivation, is suitable for growing in waterlogged sites, would attract nectar-feeding birds and would be useful for shelter and shade.

See also
List of Eucalyptus species

References

paludicola
Flora of South Australia
Myrtales of Australia
Trees of Australia
Endangered flora of Australia
Plants described in 1995